The Half-Breed's Way is a 1912 American silent short Western film starring Harry von Meter, Vivian Rich and George Beech.

External links
 

1912 Western (genre) films
1912 films
American silent short films
American black-and-white films
Silent American Western (genre) films
1910s American films
1910s English-language films